Manuel José Maciel Fernández (born 12 February 1984) is a Paraguayan footballer who currently plays for General Caballero as a striker.

Club career

Early career / Chile
Maciel's career took off in 2007 when he played for U. de Concepción.

Toluca
He was signed by Mexican club Toluca. On 22 February 2008, he scored the winning goal for Toluca in his debut.

Libertad
Maciel signed with Club Libertad during the second half of 2008.

International career
In 2008, he was called up to the Paraguay national football team.

References

External links
 
 

1984 births
Living people
Paraguayan footballers
Paraguay international footballers
Universidad de Concepción footballers
C.D. Arturo Fernández Vial footballers
Deportivo Toluca F.C. players
Club Olimpia footballers
Club Libertad footballers
Sportivo Luqueño players
Paraguayan Primera División players
Primera B de Chile players
Chilean Primera División players
Liga MX players
Paraguayan expatriate footballers
Expatriate footballers in Chile
Expatriate footballers in Mexico
Association football forwards